Katrina Milosevic (born 25 April 1976) is an Australian actress who has appeared in many television programs and theatre productions, including a starring role in the prison drama series  Wentworth.

Biography
Katrina Milosevic was born in Mount Isa, Queensland Australia on 25 April 1976. She graduated from Australia's National Institute of Dramatic Art (NIDA) in 1997 with a degree in Performing Arts and went on to work on series The Games and Blue Heelers. In 2003, she was cast in the regular role of Sophie Novak in Stingers, which saw her nominated for the Most Popular New Talent Female at the 2004 Logie awards. She remained with the show for two seasons.

Milosevic appeared in the 2005 Nine Network telemovie Little Oberon and in September 2006 she joined the Sydney Theatre Company's adaptation of the Neil LaBute play, Fat Pig.

Milosevic joined the cast of Neighbours as Kelly Katsis, a love interest for Toadfish Rebecchi (Ryan Moloney) in 2008. Milosevic's father died during her first week on set and she said that working on the show was what she needed at that time. Milosevic left Neighbours in February 2009. In 2010, Milosevic joined the Sydney Theatre Company's adaptation of Gross und Klein (Big and Small). The play premiered at the Sydney Theatre in 2011, before it went on tour in Europe in early 2012.

Milosevic had a starring role in Wentworth as Sue "Boomer" Jenkins since 2013. Katrina appeared in all 100 episodes of Wentworth and was one of the 'Wentworth Four' and was gifted a placard for the 'Wentworth 100 Club' alongside Kate Atkinson, Jacquie Brennan and Robbie Magasiva. Milosevic appeared in the fifth and final season of Winners & Losers. She also has a recurring role on Glitch. Milosevic will appear in a Paramount+ Australia original series, Spreadsheet.

In 2022 Milosevic appeared alongside several Wentworth cast members for Wentworth Con Melbourne.

Filmography

Film

Television

References

External links

Katrina Milosevic on Instagram

Australian film actresses
Australian people of Serbian descent
Australian stage actresses
Australian television actresses
Living people
1976 births
21st-century Australian actresses